Saunders' case moth or the large bagworm (Metura elongatus) is a moth of the Psychidae family. It is known from the eastern half of Australia, including Tasmania.

The wingspan is about 30 mm for males. Adult males have black wings, an orange hairy head and a black and orange banded abdomen. Female adults have no wings and remain in the larval case. They are white with a brown head  and reach a length of about 30 mm.

The larvae feed on a wide range of plants, including Conyza bonariensis, Cupressus, Epacris, Dianella brevipedunculata, Acacia dealbata, Eucalyptus, Pinus and Cotoneaster species. They create a silken shelter, which is initially covered with bits of leaf, but later also with short twigs. They live and pupate within this shelter. When threatened, they temporarily seal the front opening of the case until the danger is past.

References

Psychidae
Moths described in 1847
Taxa named by William Wilson Saunders